Attila flagello di Dio ("Attila Scourge of God") is a 1982 Italian Comedy film written and directed by Castellano e Pipolo.

Cast 
   
 Diego Abatantuono as Attila
 Mauro Di Francesco as Tartufo
 Rita Rusic as Uraia
 Angelo Infanti as Fusco Cornelio
 Toni Ucci as Fabio Massimo
 Franz Di Cioccio as Giallo
 Francesco Salvi as Barbaro Grippo
 Vincenzo Crocitti as Osvaldo
 Tony Kendall as Serpicio
 Anna Kanakis as Sirena

Plot
The misadventures of Attila, called by the Romans “The Scourge of God”, and a tribe of barbarians, located in Lombardy, who wants to lead the army to Rome and take back what the Romans has stolen from their people.

See also       
 List of Italian films of 1982

References

External links 

1980s fantasy comedy films
1982 films
Italian fantasy comedy films
Films directed by Castellano & Pipolo
1980s Italian films